"Hit the Lights" is the second single by English recording artist Jay Sean, featuring American rapper and labelmate Lil Wayne and produced by OFM production team J-Remy and Bobby Bass. It was released to UK as a digital download to iTunes on 4 February 2011, and to US radio stations and as a digital download to iTunes on 8 February 2011. It was released as a CD single in the United Kingdom on 24 April 2011.

Background
Jay Sean told MTV, "I'm so excited about this song, 'cause, for me, it's the first time I felt like I did a huge club record, I always wanted to write a song that could be batted across all the clubs and on radio. And I think this is that song. It doesn't need any remixes or anything like that." He said also "I'm feeling mad excited about "Hit the Lights". It's a club banger that's gonna get everyone movin! I'm looking forward to watching another one of my songs grow! That's the most fun part!”

Of the collaboration he told MTV News, "It's inspirational, I learn off of people who have achieved greatness. There's something about them -- their work ethic, their mentality -- that resonates and strikes a chord. So when I watch him to see what he does, in my head I'm looking at it going, 'This is why he got to where he is.' And I like to learn that." Lil Wayne previously contributed a verse to the British artist's US breakthrough single, "Down". Jay Sean told DesiHits about the difference in dynamic between "Down" and "Hit the Lights" in terms of working with Lil Wayne, "It's different when you hear his interpretation of the song, he has understood that I have taken it to a bit more of a sexy and mature level on this song. "Down" was young and playful while "Hit the Lights" is for a mature audience and it is aimed at the clubs, plus the lyrics of the song. Lil Wayne added his interpretation and of course some things had to get bleeped out."

Jay Sean sampled the song in another song he made, YMCMB Heroes, featuring Tyga, Busta Rhymes, and Cory Gunz.

"Hit the Lights" was recently featured on Las Vegas, Nevada's tourism campaign "Only Vegas" where a man at his work station was singing along to the song while viewing photos of his vacation in Las Vegas.

Track listing

Music video
Bille Woodruff directed the music video for "Hit the Lights", which premiered on 22 March 2011 on VEVO. The video has many CGI effects and features women dancing, an appearance from Lil Wayne as well as Birdman and DJ Khaled and plenty of lights.

Charts

Release history

References

2011 singles
Jay Sean songs
Lil Wayne songs
Cash Money Records singles
Songs written by Jay Sean
Songs written by Lil Wayne
Songs written by Jared Cotter
Music videos directed by Bille Woodruff